Lemešany is a village and municipality in Prešov District in the Prešov Region of eastern Slovakia.

History
In historical records the village was first mentioned in 1289.

Geography

Population 
It has a population of about 1,958 people (2020-12-31).

References

External links
 
 
Lemešany, Jewish community.

Villages and municipalities in Prešov District
Šariš